Copelatus mysorensis is a species of diving beetle. It is part of the genus Copelatus, which is in the subfamily Copelatinae of the family Dytiscidae. It was described by Vazirani in 1970.

References

mysorensis
Beetles described in 1970